Questioning the Millennium is a 1997 book by the paleontologist Stephen Jay Gould that deals with the definition and calculation of the millennium, and its meaning in Western culture. New York Times reviewer Robert Eisner described it as a "slim and attractive meditation," which touches upon calendrics, Biblical exegesis, millennial cults, and includes "a charming essay on a young autistic man whose amazing ability to calculate instantly which day of the week coincided with any date mentioned over many centuries". Gould reveals that this young man was his autistic son, Jesse.

Michiko Kakutani wrote that while not one of Gould's more important books, Questioning the Millennium "beguiles and entertains, even as it teaches us to reconsider our preconceptions about the natural world." Kakutani noted that its subject was much broader than simply the millennium, encompassing the human love for order and regularity.

References

Multimedia
"Questioning the Millennium" - interview with Gould on Charlie Rose
"Questioning the Millenium" - interview with Gould on All Things Considered

External links
Questioning the Millennium - by Stephen Jay Gould
"The First Day of the Rest of Our Life" - by Stephen Jay Gould
"Redefining the Millennium: From Sacred Showdowns to Current Countdowns" - by Stephen Jay Gould
"Dousing Diminutive Dennis's Debate (or DDDD=2000)" - by Stephen Jay Gould
"Today Is the Day" - by Stephen Jay Gould
"Fall in the House of Ussher" - by Stephen Jay Gould
Random House promotional page

1997 non-fiction books
American non-fiction books
Books by Stephen Jay Gould
English-language books
Turn of the third millennium